|}

This is a list of House of Assembly results for the 1989 Tasmanian election.

Results by division

Bass

Braddon

Denison

Franklin

Lyons

See also 

1989 Tasmanian state election
Members of the Tasmanian House of Assembly, 1989–1992

References 

Results of Tasmanian elections